Adolph John II (German: Adolf Johann II.) (21 August 1666 – 27 April 1701) was the Duke of Kleeburg from 1689 until 1701.

Life
Adolph John was born in Bergzabern in 1666 as the eldest surviving son of Adolph John I, Count Palatine of Kleeburg and Elsa Elisabeth Brahe. He succeeded his father in 1689. Adolph John died in Laiuse Castle in 1701 and was buried in Stockholm. As he never married he was succeeded by his brother Gustavus Samuel Leopold.

Ancestors 

1666 births
1701 deaths
Counts Palatine of the Holy Roman Empire
House of Wittelsbach
People of the Swedish Empire
Burials at Riddarholmen Church